Felsőjánosfa is a village in Vas county, Hungary.

Populated places in Vas County